Aitzaz Hasan Bangash (1998/1999 – 6 January 2014) was a student from Pakistan who died on 6 January 2014 while preventing a suicide bomber from entering a school at Hangu village. More than 2,000 students were attending classes at the time of the incident. The institute was later renamed to Aitzaz Hasan Shaheed High School. His death anniversary is observed annually in Pakistan, particularly in the Khyber Pakhtunkhwa province on 6 January. His life is covered by a biographical film Salute.

Aitzaz's successful effort in saving his classmates captured the hearts of the nation, and he was hailed as a Shaheed and National hero. Later, the Government of Pakistan posthumously awarded him Sitara-e-Shujaat (Star of Bravery) . He was named as the Herald's Person of the Year for 2014.

Life 
Aitzaz Hasan's father is Mujahid Ali, who was in the United Arab Emirates at the time of the attack. It was typical for men in this impoverished region to go abroad, including the Gulf region, to provide for their families. 
The area where Aitzaz Hasan lived is home to many Shi'ite Muslims, a number of whom have been killed by the Tehrik-i-Taliban Pakistan. The teenager was known for openly criticizing armed radical groups.

Death 
On 6 January 2014, Aitzaz was outside the school gate of his Government High School, Ibrahimzai, in Hangu, with two other schoolmates. Aitzaz had not been allowed to attend the morning assembly due to his tardiness that day. One account states that around this time a 20-to-25-year-old man approached the gate and stated he was there to "take admission". One of the students noticed a detonator on the man's vest, whereupon Aitzaz's schoolmates ran inside, possibly to raise the alarm, while Aitzaz confronted the suicide bomber, who then detonated his vest.

According to other accounts, Aitzaz was on his way to school when he spotted a suspicious person. When Aitzaz tried to stop him, he started walking faster towards the school. In an attempt to stop the bomber, Aitzaz threw a stone which failed to hit him. Then Aitzaz ran towards the person and bear hugged him, prompting the suicide bomber to detonate his explosive-laden vest. Aitzaz died at the scene. No other students were harmed.

Aftermath 
Aitzaz's father said that his son made a sacrifice to save the lives of others: "My son made his mother cry but saved hundreds of mothers from crying for their children." Scores of people attended his funeral to pay their respects. A floral wreath was laid on the grave of Aitzaz Hasan on behalf of the Pakistani Army chief. Aitzaz's story led to an outpouring of emotion on television and on social media, where the hashtag #onemillionaitzazs trended on Twitter. A Facebook page has been set up in tribute to his act.

The group Lashkar-e-Jhangvi claimed responsibility for the attack.

The Minister for Information in Khyber Pakhtunkhwa province, Shah Farman, said that Aitzaz was a "real hero and true face of the people of Khyber Pakhtunkhwa".

Pakistani Chief of the Army Staff General Raheel Sharif said that Aitzaz Hasan is "a national hero, who has sacrificed his today for our tomorrow."

Malala Yousafzai, another prominent Pakistani teenager and education activist who was the winner of the 2014 Nobel Peace Prize, described Aitzaz as "brave and courageous" and said "his bravery must never be forgotten".

Jamiat Ulema-e-Islam (F), led by Fazal-ur-Rehman described Aitzaz as a "Mujahid", and said "he is symbol of resistance against terrorism".

On 12 January, the government of Pakistan announced establishment of Aitizaz Hasan Fund, a trust fund for Aitzaz's family. On 14 January, the provincial governmental representatives announced a Rs 5 million package for the family of the teen and renamed his school as the Aitzaz Hasan Shaheed High School.

A hostel constructed at College of EME was named after him.

Popular Culture 
 Salute – a 2016 Pakistani biographical film  directed, written and produced by Shahzad Rafique, and starring Ali Mohtesham as Aitzaz Hasan.

Awards and honors 
Many people demanded that the Nishan-e-Haider, or a similar award, be awarded to Aitzaz Hasan posthumously. The office of Pakistan Prime Minister Nawaz Sharif then recommended President Mamnoon Husain to confer Aitzaz Hasan with the high civil award Sitara-e-Shujaat (Star of Bravery). The award was received by Hasan's family on 23 March during Pakistan's national day.

On 12 January 2014, the International Human Rights Commission (IHRC) bestowed a global bravery award on Hasan.

Aitzaz was named as Herald's Person of the year 2014. Herald's annual Person of the Year project sets out to recognize those individuals in Pakistan who had a profound influence on the news and who embodied, for good or ill, what was important about the year. Hasan, whose sacrifice attained further poignancy after the 16 December attack on Peshawar's Army Public School, emerged as the winner in a three-way voting process that included online voting, postal ballots and input from a panel of 10 eminent Pakistanis. In Herald's upcoming annual issue, Yousafzai – Herald's Person of the Year for 2012 – pays tribute to Hasan, writing: "Our country is blessed with brave people. The story of Aitzaz Hasan reflects their reliance, courage and bravery."

Notes

References 

2014 murders in Pakistan
1990s births
Pakistani terrorism victims
Victims of the Tehrik-i-Taliban Pakistan
People from Hangu District, Pakistan
2014 deaths
Pakistani Shia Muslims
Pashtun people
Pakistani children
Suicide bombings in Pakistan
Violence against Shia Muslims in Pakistan
School bombings
Failed terrorist attempts in Asia
Lashkar-e-Jhangvi attacks
Recipients of Sitara-i-Shujaat